The 2020–21 Moroccan Throne Cup was the 67th staging of the Moroccan Throne Cup, the main knockout football tournament in Morocco.

Final phase

Round of 32
Draw of the 2020–21 Moroccan Throne Cup round of 32

Round of 16

Quarter-finals

Semifinals

Final 

<onlyinclude>

References

External links
Coupe du Trone: Résultats, frmf.ma
Moroccan Cup 2022- 2023, Goalzz.com

Morocco
Coupe